The Albania men's national under-18 basketball team is a national basketball team of Albania, administered by the Albanian Basketball Federation (FSHB) It represents the country in international men's under-18 basketball competitions.

The team won three medals at the FIBA U18 European Championship Division C.

See also
Albania men's national basketball team
Albania men's national under-16 basketball team
Albania women's national under-18 basketball team

FIBA U18 European Championship participations

References

External links
Archived records of Albania team participations

Basketball in Albania
Under-18
National sports teams of Albania
Men's national under-18 basketball teams